Elizabeth Taylor  (January 8, 1856 – March, 1932) was an American artist, journalist, botanist and traveller. Her travel essays from Alaska, Canada, Iceland, the Faroe Islands and Norway were published in Frank Leslie's Popular Monthly, Atlantic Monthly, Forest and Stream and others. Some of her essays are published in The Far Islands and Other Cold Places.

During World War I she was marooned at Eiði in the Faroe Islands, where she was a probable influence on Faroese painting pioneer Niels Kruse.  She died at her cottage Wake Robin in Vermont, in 1932.

References

External links
 
 
 JAMES TAYLOR DUNN AND FAMILY: An Inventory of Their Papers at the Minnesota Historical Society

1856 births
1932 deaths
American women painters
Botanical illustrators
American women botanists
American botanists
American travel writers
Artists from Vermont
American women scientists
American women writers
American women travel writers
American women journalists
19th-century American painters
20th-century American painters
19th-century American women artists
20th-century American women artists